Andamayo River (possibly from Quechua anta copper, mayu river, "copper river") or Capiza is a river in Peru located in the Arequipa Region, Castilla Province, in the districts Aplao and Tipan. Its direction is mainly to the south where it meets Colca River as a right affluent. The confluence is north of the village Andamayo.

References

Rivers of Peru
Rivers of Arequipa Region